Rear Admiral Walter Hose,  (2 October 1875 – 22 June 1965) was an officer of the Royal Navy (RN), the Royal Canadian Navy (RCN) and founder of the Royal Canadian Naval Volunteer Reserve (RCNVR).

Along with Rear Admiral Charles Kingsmill, Walter Hose is known as the "Father of the Royal Canadian Navy".

Early career with the Royal Navy
Rear Admiral Hose was born on a ship in the Indian Ocean and joined the Royal Navy when he was 14. Assigned to HMS Britannia upon entering the service, Hose rose through the ranks and was promoted lieutenant on 31 December 1897 and commander on 31 December 1908. During these years he held six commands, including commanding gunboats in Asia and a torpedo gunboat with the Royal Navy Home Fleet.

Royal Canadian Navy

HMCS Rainbow and the First World War

Loaned to the fledgling Royal Canadian Navy as the Captain of HMCS Rainbow in 1911, Hose resigned his commission in 1912 and formally transferred to the RCN. He retained command of HMCS Rainbow and remained stationed at the naval base at Esquimalt where he would play an instrumental role in the creation of Canada's volunteer reserve leading up to the Great War.

In 1912, Hose recommended to Rear Admiral Kingsmill, then Director of the Naval Service, that for the RCN to survive, Canada would require a volunteer citizen navy stationed at naval reserve units across the country. With this advice falling on deaf ears, in 1913 together with a group of businessmen and yachtsmen from Victoria, Hose defiantly created a "Company of Volunteers" who he allowed to use the naval base facilities and instructors under his command. When war was declared in 1914, these unofficial naval volunteers became the core of an 8,000-man Royal Canadian Naval Volunteer Reserve.

After the threat had passed, Commander Hose focused his efforts on preventing German vessels from leaving port and even taking two prizes. He was then named Captain of Patrols by Admiral Kingsmill. As captain of patrols he commanded over fifty vessels to fight the U-boat threat. It was the position he would hold until the end of the war.

Interwar service

After the retirement of Admiral Kingsmill, Hose was appointed acting Director of the Naval Service in 1921 and Director of the Naval Service in 1922. During his time as commander Hose decommissioned the majority of the navy, and shut the Royal Naval College of Canada and the Youth Training Establishment in Halifax. He took the money saved by doing this and formally created the Royal Canadian Naval Volunteer Reserve.

In 1922 government cuts in the armed services of Canada were put in place and there was an effort by the government of the day to integrate the services under one commander-in-chief. Hose argued against this, demanding to continue to have access to the minister. Aided by the deputy minister Georges Desbarats, he prevented the navy from falling under the command of the position of the Chief of Staff. The position of Director was renamed as Chief of the Naval Staff in 1928 and he served in this position until his retirement in 1934.

Hose died in Windsor, Ontario in 1965 and received a full military funeral with six Reserve Petty Officer pallbearers from  – one of the Naval Reserve units Hose he created in 1923. A monument at Point Pleasant Park in Halifax Nova Scotia honours his work saving and building the Royal Canadian Navy during the difficult years after the First World War and in the Great Depression.

On 22 June 2019, as part of the Government of Canada's 'Hometown Heroes' programme, Hose was commemorated at Heavenly Rest Catholic Cemetery in Windsor, Ontario, in a ceremony which referred to him as the "father" of Canada's naval reserve.  In the presence of Terry Leahey, Hose's grandson, Vice-Admiral Art McDonald, the commander of the Royal Canadian Navy, spoke of the role he played in Canada's naval history.

Awards and decorations
Hose's personal awards and decorations include the following:

125px

127px

Footnotes

References

External links 

 Canada's 25 Most Renowned Military Leaders

1875 births
1965 deaths
Canadian admirals
Canadian military personnel of World War I
Canadian Commanders of the Order of the British Empire
Naval history of Canada
Royal Canadian Navy officers
Royal Navy officers
Commanders of the Royal Canadian Navy